South Boarhunt is a small village in the civil parish of Boarhunt in the City of Winchester district of Hampshire, England. Its nearest town is Fareham, which lies approximately 2 miles (3.2 km) south-west from the village.

References 

Villages in Hampshire